Class of Nuke 'Em High (also known as Atomic High School) is a 1986 American science-fiction horror comedy film made by B-movie production company Troma Entertainment. It was directed by Richard W. Haines and Lloyd Kaufman under the pseudonym "Samuel Weil". New York holographer Jason Sapan created the laser effects.

Plot
The film follows the events that unfold at Tromaville High School in New Jersey, which is conveniently located next to a nuclear power plant. An accident at the nuclear plant is covered up by plant owner, Mr. Paley, who does not want the facility shut down by the safety commission. The accident causes a radioactive water leak which ends up gruesomely killing a student at the school after the tainted water reaches the drinking fountain. The gang of the school, called "The Cretins," who were originally part of the honor society, torments the school, and it's implied that they have been turned into violent psychopaths by the runoff from the plant. They pick leaves from a radioactive marijuana plant located in the yard of the nuclear plant and sell it to Eddie for $10.

At his "indoor bikini beach party" that night, Eddie pressures his friend Warren and Warren's girlfriend Chrissy into smoking the radioactive joint, but it accidentally falls on the floor and is trampled by other party-goers before anyone else can try it. The mutated drug shows itself to have potent aphrodisiac effects, leading to Warren and Chrissy having sex in Eddie's loft. However, that same night, both of them have disturbing nightmares about hideously mutating, though these effects are seemingly gone by morning. Some time later, Chrissy discovers that she is pregnant, and spits a little monster into a nearby toilet. The creature travels through the water pipes and lands in a barrel filled with radioactive waste, and mutates into a bigger creature. The Nuclear Plant orders a lock down of the school, and begins an investigation into the student who died at the beginning of the film. One of the Nuclear workers begins to investigate the basement. Though his equipment shows signs of a spill, he can't find any evidence, outside of a foul odor. After hearing for a second time a sound he'd previously dismissed, he investigates. As he's observing a barrel, the monster's arm reaches out and claws his face, disfiguring him. As the worker screams out in pain, the monster pulls him into the barrel and eats him, only to cough up his left hand and I.D. badge, making the worker the monster's first kill.

Meanwhile, Warren, tired of the Cretins' constant harassment, ends up going on a radiation-fueled rampage, killing two of them, with no memory of the event once he comes to his senses. The Cretins, expelled from the school and cut off from their customer base, assault the principal and force him to use the school's Radiation Alarm to cause an evacuation, letting the Cretins bar the building and occupy it. In the process of doing this, the Cretins shoot and kill the principal's secretary, who happened to open the door just as the gang was torturing the principal. Capturing Chrissy as bait for Warren, the leader of the gang holds her hostage in the basement and plans to kill her in front of Warren, only to be interrupted by the now adult monster.

Warren goes into the school to save her, and he discovers the adult monster, who kills every one of the Cretins. Warren finally zaps the beast with a laser in the physics laboratory, and he and Chrissy flee from the school, right after the monster explodes along with the school, also killing Mr. Paley inside. The students celebrate victory as over the loudspeakers that the school will be shut down for remodeling. While reconstruction is taking place, one of the monster "babies" appears squirming through the remains of the destroyed school. The screen freeze frames on the creature as the screen inverts, shortly before fading out and the credits roll.

Cast
 Janelle Brady as Chrissy
 Gil Brenton as Warren
 Robert Prichard as Spike
 James Nugent Vernon as Eddie
 Pat Ryan Jr. as Mr. Paley
 Brad Dunker as Gonzo
 Gary Schneider as Pete
 Theo Cohan as Muffey
 Rick Howard as Spud
 Gary Rosenblatt as Greg
 Mary Taylor as Judy
 Lauren Heather McMahon as Taru

Music

Ethan Hurt was credited as the composer for the film, and his contributions included the "Nuke 'Em High" theme as a full-band arrangement. The soundtrack to the film remained unreleased until 2014, when Troma licensed its release on the Ship to Shore PhonoCo. label. The album was released in physical form exclusively on LP record as a limited pressing of 1,300 copies, with 700 being black, 300 of a green-colored version known as "Atomic High", and another 300 of a green/blue color known as "Dewey's Meltdown". Each copy included a card with a code that allowed for download of an expanded digital release that contained commentary on each song from Troma President and Class of Nuke 'Em High co-director Lloyd Kaufman.

All songs from the soundtrack were featured in the film except two tracks. "We Are One" by Ethan & the Coup who had previously written the song for the movie in 1986, but missed the deadline for submission for the film to be included. The theme to Class of Nuke 'Em High 2: Subhumanoid Meltdown was only heard on the film's sequel.

Original Motion Picture Soundtrack
"Troma Leader" – 0:15
"Nuke 'Em High" by Ethan & the Coup – 4:23
"Emotional Refugee" by David Behennah – 3:21
"Angel" by GMT – 3:41
"Rock 'n' Roll Paradise" by Stormbringer – 7:09
"Much Too Much" by The Smithereens – 2:22
"Run for Your Life" by Stratus – 4:27
"We Are One" by Ethan & the Coup – 4:05
"Class of Nuke 'Em High Part 2" – 3:20

Sequels
The film spawned four sequels. Two came in the 1990s with 1991's Class of Nuke 'Em High 2: Subhumanoid Meltdown and 1994's Class of Nuke 'Em High 3: The Good, the Bad and the Subhumanoid. These two sequels were not directed by either Lloyd Kaufman or Michael Herz, but were produced by them. They were more comedic than violent and had good production values despite the low budget. The sequels marked the first appearance by Tromie the radioactive squirrel. Two sequels directed by Kaufman arrived in the 2010s. A fourth installment of the series called Return to Nuke 'Em High Volume 1 was released in January 2014. The fifth entry, Return to Return to Nuke 'Em High AKA Volume 2, premiered at 2017 Cannes Film Festival.

Remake
On April 7, 2010, Kaufman announced that he has been contacted about remaking Class of Nuke 'Em High. Kaufman has already confirmed that other '80s Troma classics such The Toxic Avenger, which will have a PG-13 rating and Mother's Day would also receive remakes by other studios. As of 2013, the Toxic Avenger remake has yet to be produced, but a Mother's Day remake was released by Anchor Bay Films in 2011.

Reception

Class of Nuke 'Em High has received generally negative reviews. On review aggregator website Rotten Tomatoes, the film received an approval rating of 20% based on 5 reviews, with an average rating of 4.2/10.

References

External links

 
 
 The official home of Troma Entertainment

1986 films
1986 horror films
1980s comedy horror films
American comedy horror films
American science fiction comedy films
American high school films
American independent films
American science fiction horror films
1980s English-language films
Films directed by Lloyd Kaufman
Films set in New Jersey
Films shot in New Jersey
Films shot in New York (state)
Punk films
Troma Entertainment films
Stoner films
1986 comedy films
1980s American films